Hollym is a small village and civil parish in the East Riding of Yorkshire, England, in an area known as Holderness.

According to the 2011 UK Census, Hollym parish had a population of 513, an increase on the 2001 UK Census figure of 447.

Hollym airfield lies just to the north of the village and is suitable for light aircraft.

The parish church of St Nicholas is a Grade II listed building.

In 1823 Hollym was parish in the Wapentake and Liberty of Holderness. St Nicholas' Church was built in 1814 by the then vicar. Population at the time was 260. Occupations included seventeen farmers, a corn miller, a schoolmaster, and the landlady of The Plough public house. A carrier operated between the village and Hull once a week.

Hollym was served from 1854 to 1964 by Hollym Gate railway station on the Hull and Holderness Railway.

Edmund Henry Barker, the English classical scholar, was born in the village.

References

External links

Villages in the East Riding of Yorkshire
Holderness
Civil parishes in the East Riding of Yorkshire